Chaudhry Zaheer Ud Din (born on 22 February 1945) is a Pakistani politician, Former Provincial Minister of Punjab for Public Prosecution, in office from 6 September 2018 to 10 April 2022. He had been a member of the Provincial Assembly of the Punjab from August 2018 till January 2023.

Previously, he was a member of the Punjab Assembly from 1988 to 1990, from 1993 to 1996, from 2002 to 2007 and again from 2008 to 2013.

Early life and education
He was born on 22 February 1945 in Gurdaspur, India.

He graduated from the University of the Punjab in 1969 and received a degree of Bachelor of Arts.

Political career

He was elected to the Provincial Assembly of the Punjab as a candidate of Pakistan Peoples Party (PPP) from Constituency PP-46 (Faisalabad-IV) in 1988 Pakistani general election. He received 21,761 votes and defeated Muhammad Akram Chaudhry, a candidate of Islami Jamhoori Ittehad (IJI).

He ran for the seat of the Provincial Assembly of the Punjab as a candidate of Pakistan Democratic Alliance (PDA) from Constituency PP-46 (Faisalabad-IV) in 1990 Pakistani general election but was unsuccessful. He received 15,607 votes and lost the seat to Muhammad Akram Chaudhry, a candidate of IJI.

He was re-elected to the Provincial Assembly of the Punjab as a candidate of PPP from Constituency PP-46 (Faisalabad-IV) in 1993 Pakistani general election. He received 29,896 votes and defeated Muhammad Akram Chaudhry, a candidate of Pakistan Muslim League (N) (PML-N).

He was re-elected to the Provincial Assembly of the Punjab as a candidate of Pakistan Muslim League (Q) (PML-Q) from Constituency PP-55 (Faisalabad-V) in 2002 Pakistani general election. He received 24,370 votes and defeated Talib Hussain Ijaz, a candidate of PPP. On 3 January 2003, he was inducted into the provincial Punjab cabinet of Chief Minister Chaudhry Pervaiz Elahi and was appointed as Provincial Minister of Punjab for Communications and Works.

He was re-elected to the Provincial Assembly of the Punjab as a candidate of PML-Q from Constituency PP-55 (Faisalabad-V) in 2008 Pakistani general election. He received 26,520 votes and defeated Rana Muhammad Idress Khan, a candidate of PML-N.

In March 2008, he became leader of the opposition in the Punjab Assembly. In March 2011, he resigned as leader of the opposition in the Punjab Assembly.

He ran for the seat of the National Assembly of Pakistan as a candidate of PML-Q from Constituency NA-77 (Faisalabad-III) in 2013 Pakistani general election but was unsuccessful. He received 58,680 votes and lost the seat to Muhammad Asim Nazir. In the same election, he ran for the seat of the Provincial Assembly of the Punjab as a candidate of PML-Q from Constituency PP-55 (Faisalabad-V) but was unsuccessful. He received 27,117 votes and lost the seat to Rana Shoaib Adrees Khan.

He was re-elected to the Provincial Assembly of the Punjab as a candidate of Pakistan Tehreek-e-Insaf from Constituency PP-100 (Faisalabad-IV) in 2018 Pakistani general election.

On 27 August 2018, he was inducted into the provincial Punjab cabinet of Chief Minister Sardar Usman Buzdar without any ministerial portfolio. On 6 September 2018, he was appointed as Provincial Minister of Punjab for public prosecution.

References

Living people
Pakistan Tehreek-e-Insaf MPAs (Punjab)
Provincial ministers of Punjab
1945 births
Punjab MPAs 1988–1990
Punjab MPAs 1993–1996
Punjab MPAs 2002–2007
Punjab MPAs 2008–2013
Pakistan People's Party MPAs (Punjab)
Pakistan Muslim League (Q) MPAs (Punjab)